Loft design by is a French fashion label and retail chain. As of July 2016, Loft has eleven shops in France, three in London, and shops in Moscow and Luxembourg.

The company was founded in 1989 by Patrick Henri Freche, and the headquarters are in Paris.

In 2009, Vogue noted that the "lifestyle brand" was "set to become a yummy mummy favourite" in the UK.

References

Clothing brands of France
Clothing retailers of France
Companies based in Paris